Luther McDonald (February 6, 1906 – May 1, 1976) was an American Negro league pitcher between 1927 and 1935.

A native of Greene County, Mississippi, McDonald made his Negro leagues debut in 1927 for the St. Louis Stars, and pitched for the Stars in their 1928 Negro National League championship series victory over the Chicago American Giants. He died in Chicago, Illinois in 1976 at age 70.

References

External links
 and Seamheads

1906 births
1976 deaths
Chicago American Giants players
Detroit Stars players
St. Louis Stars (baseball) players
20th-century African-American sportspeople
Baseball pitchers